Pňov-Předhradí is a municipality in Kolín District in the Central Bohemian Region of the Czech Republic. It has about 600 inhabitants.

Administrative parts
The municipality is made up of villages of Pňov, Předhradí and Klipec.

References

Villages in Kolín District